The videography of Australian recording artist Kylie Minogue, consists of 82 music videos, 10 lyric videos, 11 concert tour video releases, 11 music video compilations and 2 documentaries.

Music videos

1980s

1990s

2000s

2010s

2020s

Lyric videos

Video albums

Concert tour

Music video compilations

Documentaries

References

Works cited
 The Complete Kylie, Simon Sheridan, Reynolds & Hearn Books (February 2009) (2nd ed.)

External links
 

Videographies of Australian artists
 
Australian filmographies
Videography